Oracle Reports is a tool for developing reports against data stored in an Oracle database. Oracle Reports consists of Oracle Reports Developer (a component of the Oracle Developer Suite) and Oracle Application Server Reports Services (a component of the Oracle Application Server).

Output formats
The report output can be delivered directly to a printer or saved in the following formats: HTML, RTF, PDF, XML, Microsoft Excel

History

Oracle RPT 
Oracle RPT was an early, primitive predecessor to SQL*Report Writer.  There was no editor or IDE provided and instead the reports were created by editing text files to control the report output.

SQL*Report Writer 
 Character based report writing tool.
 The software was purchased by Oracle from a third party

Oracle Reports 1 
 New GUI mode IDE
 Major rewrite

Oracle Reports 2.0

Oracle Reports 2.5 

Release April 1995.
New Object Navigator.
New Toolbars.
New Menus.

Still no undos.

More stable IDE.

Oracle Reports 6i 
New features added in 6i:
 WebDB integration
 XML Output
 HTML Parameter Form Extensions
 SQL Access to the Reports Server Queue
 EXEC_SQL Integration

Oracle Reports 9i 
New features added in 9i:
 XML report definition
 Query types: XML, JDBC, Oracle9i OLAP, text files
 Pluggable Data Sources
 Java Importer
 Oracle9i JDeveloper Integration
 Oracle9i SCM Integration
 Integration with BI Beans
 Oracle9iAS Portal Report Import
 Edit Oracle9iAS Discoverer Worksheet Export.

Oracle Reports 10g 
New features added in 10g:
 New output format spreadsheet, output to Microsoft Excel.
 Extended HTML formatting customisation
 Compliant to HTML 4.01 and XML 1.1 standards...

References

External links
 Oracle Reports
 Oracle Reports FAQ
 RPT Conversion to PL/SQL Stored Procedures

Oracle software
Reporting software